Dial is an American brand of soap and body wash manufactured by Henkel North American Consumer Goods, the American subsidiary of Henkel AG & Co. KGaA. It was the world's first antibacterial soap.

History

Dial was developed by a chemist from Armour and Company, a meat-packing company, and introduced in the Chicago market in 1948. Armour had produced soap since 1888; its laundry soap was made from tallow, a by-product of Armour's meat production processes. Dial was made antibacterial by the addition of hexachlorophene, referred to by the company as AT-7. The product was named Dial and promised "round-the-clock" protection against the odor caused by perspiration.

Dial was introduced nationally in 1949 and was advertised as "the first active, really effective deodorant soap in all history [because it] removes skin bacteria that cause perspiration odor". Although researchers had never established a link between hexachlorophene and germ protection, Armour's early advertisements graphically depicted germs and microbes before and after use of Dial soap. Hexachlorophene, the active ingredient in Dial, was removed from the consumer market and strictly limited in the hospital setting in the early 1970s amid reports that it caused neurological damage in infants. When the U.S. Food and Drug Administration (FDA) outlawed its use in non-medicinal products, Armour-Dial replaced it with triclocarban, a synthetic antibacterial compound.

Dial became the leading deodorant soap brand in the U.S.  From 1953 until the mid-1990s, Dial soap was advertised under the slogan "Aren't you glad you use Dial? (Don't you wish everybody did?)" which became a popular catchphrase.

In September 2016, the FDA ruled that antibacterial soaps containing triclocarban and triclosan can no longer be marketed. Dial replaced these ingredients with benzalkonium chloride (for bar soaps) and benzethonium chloride (for liquid hand soaps). In its 2016 ruling, the FDA also stated that it is deferring the final rule on benzalkonium chloride, benzethonium chloride and chloroxylenol by a year to allow for the development and submission of new safety and effectiveness data for these ingredients. Consumer antibacterial washes containing these specific ingredients may be marketed during this time while data are being collected.

Products
In addition to the original bar soap, other products sold under the Dial name include liquid body wash, hand sanitizer, and hand soap.

References

External links 
Dial Soap website

Soap brands
Products introduced in 1948
Henkel brands
Dial Corporation brands